Zonadhesin is a protein that in humans is encoded by the ZAN gene.

Function

This gene encodes a protein that functions in the species specificity of sperm adhesion to the egg zona pellucida. The encoded protein is located in the acrosome and may be involved in signaling or gamete recognition. 

An allelic polymorphism in this gene results in both functional and frameshifted alleles; the reference genome represents the functional allele. Alternative splicing of this gene results in multiple transcript variants. [provided by RefSeq, Jul 2015].

References

Further reading